Girtford Halt was a short-lived railway halt on the Varsity Line which served the hamlet of Girtford near Sandy in Bedfordshire, England. It was opened by the London, Midland and Scottish Railway in 1938, but closed to passenger traffic two years later in 1940. The line itself closed in 1968, and the site of the railway station has been obliterated by a roundabout.

History 
In January 1938, the LMSR opened Girtford Halt at the point where the A1 crossed the Varsity Line, a little to the north of the small hamlet from which it took its name. A siding for vegetable traffic had existed on the station site since 1863 and this remained open. Passenger facilities consisted of little more than a raised concrete platform; access was via a field to the rear of the station; tickets had to be purchased from a nearby garage. The station was, however, little used and passenger services were withdrawn in November 1940, the station remaining open for freight until 1951.

Present day 
No trace of the station remains and its site has been taken over by a roundabout on Georgetown Road, a new road skirting the London Road Industrial Estate.

References

External links 
 

Disused railway stations in Bedfordshire
Former London, Midland and Scottish Railway stations
Railway stations in Great Britain opened in 1938
Railway stations in Great Britain closed in 1940